Cara C. Pavalock-D'Amato is an American attorney and politician serving as a member of the Connecticut House of Representatives from the 77th district. Elected in November 2014, she assumed office on January 7, 2015.

Early life and education 
Pavalock-D'Amato was born in Bristol, Connecticut and graduated from St. Paul Catholic High School. She earned a Bachelor of Arts degree from Providence College, a Juris Doctor from the St. Thomas University School of Law, and a Master of Laws in taxation from the Georgetown University Law Center.

Career 
After graduating from law school, Pavalock-D'Amato returned to Bristol and established a law firm. She was elected to the Connecticut House of Representatives in November 2014 and assumed office on January 7, 2015. Pavalock-D'Amato is the ranking member of the House Insurance and Real Estate Committee.

References 

Living people
People from Bristol, Connecticut
Providence College alumni
St. Thomas University (Florida) alumni
Georgetown University Law Center alumni
Connecticut lawyers
Republican Party members of the Connecticut House of Representatives
Women state legislators in Connecticut
Year of birth missing (living people)
21st-century American women politicians
21st-century American politicians